Cibirhiza is a genus of plants in the family Apocynaceae, first described as a genus in 1988. It is native to central and eastern Africa and to the Arabian Peninsula.

Species
 Cibirhiza albersiana Kunz, Meve & Liede - Tanzania, Zambia 
 Cibirhiza dhofarensis P.Bruyns -  Oman 
 Cibirhiza spiculata Thulin & Goyder  - E Ethiopia

References

Apocynaceae genera
Asclepiadoideae